Moroccans in Germany are residents of Germany who are of Moroccan descent. According to the Federal Statistical Office of Germany, as of 2018, there are total 76,200 Moroccan citizens living in Germany without German citizenship. Of those, 505 individuals were granted asylum status.

Nowadays, most Moroccan-Germans have German and Moroccan citizenship. 

In Germany, especially in the Rhine-Main area, many persons of Moroccan descent have roots in the province Nador.

Among the Moroccan community in Germany, there is also a small, significant minority of people Spanish-Moroccan origin.

According to a BKA report on statistics from 2017, immigrants from Morocco constituted 1.0% of all asylum seekers between 2015-2017 and those group represent 3.9% of all migrant crime suspects.

Notable individuals

References

Moroccan diaspora in Europe
Ethnic groups in Germany